Cem Atan (born 30 June 1985 in Wiener Neustadt) is a Turkish-Austrian footballer who plays as a midfielder for ASK Eggendorf.

Career

ASK Eggendorf
In January 2018, Atan joined ASK Eggendorf.

References

External links

 
 
 

1985 births
Living people
Austrian people of Turkish descent
Sportspeople from Wiener Neustadt
Footballers from Lower Austria
Turkish footballers
Austrian footballers
Austria international footballers
SV Mattersburg players
Gençlerbirliği S.K. footballers
1. Wiener Neustädter SC players
TSV Hartberg players
LASK players
Fethiyespor footballers
Gümüşhanespor footballers
Austrian Football Bundesliga players
2. Liga (Austria) players
Bundesliga players
Süper Lig players
TFF Second League players
Association football midfielders